Gungal is a locality in the Upper Hunter Shire of New South Wales, Australia.

Gungal is located on the Golden Highway,  between Sandy Hollow and Merriwa.  The abandoned Merriwa branch of the railway crossed the main road at a level crossing at Gungal.

Towns in the Hunter Region
Suburbs of Upper Hunter Shire